Nirmal Singh Kahlon (1942/1943 – 16 July 2022) was an Indian politician and member of Shiromani Akali Dal. He was the speaker of the Punjab Legislative Assembly.

Posts held in the State of Punjab
Minister of Rural Development and Panchayats State of Punjab from 1997 to 2002.
Speaker of the Punjab Legislative Assembly from 2007 to 2012.

Controversies
Kahlon was charged in a recruitment scam case but was later acquitted by the courts.

Personal life
Kahlon was married to Surinder Kaur Kahlon. She died in 2015. He died in Amritsar on 16 July 2022 at the age of 79.

References

1940s births
2022 deaths
Shiromani Akali Dal politicians
Speakers of the Punjab Legislative Assembly
Punjab, India MLAs 2002–2007
Punjab, India MLAs 1997–2002
Year of birth missing